Fatma Demir (born 5 May 1996) is a Turkish long-distance runner. In 2020, she competed in the women's half marathon at the 2020 World Athletics Half Marathon Championships held in Gdynia, Poland. A few months earlier, she won the Istanbul Half Marathon held in Istanbul, Turkey.

In 2017, she competed in the women's half marathon at the 2017 Summer Universiade held in Taipei, Taiwan. Two years later, in 2019, she competed in the women's half marathon at the 2019 Summer Universiade held in Naples, Italy. She finished in 10th place.

References

External links 
 

Living people
1996 births
Place of birth missing (living people)
Turkish female middle-distance runners
Turkish female long-distance runners
Competitors at the 2017 Summer Universiade
Competitors at the 2019 Summer Universiade
21st-century Turkish sportswomen